Shimon Abuhatzira (or Abu Hazira, ; born 10 October 1986) is an Israeli footballer who plays as a striker. He is related to the Baba Sali.

Early life
Abuhatzira was born in Netanya, Israel, to a family of Sephardic Jewish descent.

Club career
He started to play football as a kid when he was part of Beitar Nes Tubruk. In 2003, he moved to Hapoel Petah Tikva, and became a member of the senior side when he was 19 years old. In 3 years with the senior team he made 125 caps, 28 goals and 5 assists.

On 21 May 2009, it was said that Abuhatzira agreed to sign a 2-year contract with Greek club Larissa without of Hapoel Petah Tikva permission. On June 22, 2009 Larissa's official website named him as a newcomer on an article about the club's first training for the 2009–10 season. The official announcement about his transfer was made on July 1, 2009. he was released from the club after scoring 3 goals in 19 caps.

In January 2011, Abuhatzira returned to Israel and signed in Ironi Kiryat Shmona, after half a good season, he scored 7 goals and reached with the team to the Israeli State Cup semi final in the end of the season abuhatzira signed for three more years in the team.

In December 2011 Abuhatzira extended his contract in Ironi Kiryat Shmona for more four years, at the end of the season his team won the first championship in its history, and he finished as top scorer of the team with 13 goals and 6 assists in addition he help his team to win the Toto Cup 4–3 on penalties after a 1–1 draw against Hapoel Tel Aviv.

In his third season with kiryat shmona Abuhatzira scored 15 league goals including 4 goals against Hapoel Tel Aviv at the Bloomfield Stadium and 24 goals in all competitions he played with kiryat shmona in the Europa League and scored 3 goals including a brace against Lyon In addition he reach with his team to the Israeli State Cup final, and scored the advantage goal against Hapoel Ramat Gan, but eventually his team lost 4–2 on penalties after a 1–1 draw.

On 24 June 2013 he signed with Israeli giants Maccabi Haifa.

On May 25, 2018 Abuhatzira returned to Israeli Premier League club Ironi Kiryat Shmona.

Style of play
Abuhatzira is a striker who can play as a centre forward and second striker. agile, quick and powerful, Abuhatzira is credited with pace, strength, and technical ability.

International career
On October 16, 2012 Abuhatzira made his debut on the national team, when he came on as a substitute in the game against Luxembourg in 2014 FIFA World Cup qualifiers.
On June 2, 2013 he scored his debut goal, in a friendly match against Honduras.

Personal life 
On 18 May 2009, Abuhatzira married his Israeli girlfriend Reut in a Jewish ceremony at Tel Ya, a wedding hall in kibbutz Tel Yitzhak, Israel.

Club career statistics
(correct as of March 2013)

International goals
Scores and results list Israel's goal tally first.

Honours

Club
Ironi Kiryat Shmona
Israeli Premier League (1): 2011–12
Toto Cup (2): 2010–11, 2011–12

Maccabi Haifa
Israel State Cup (1): 2015–16

Individual
Hapoel Petah Tikva
Israeli Premier League – 2008–09 Top Goalscorer

References

External links
 
 Profile and statistics at One.co.il 
 
 

1986 births
Living people
Israeli footballers
Hapoel Petah Tikva F.C. players
Beitar Nes Tubruk F.C. players
Athlitiki Enosi Larissa F.C. players
Hapoel Ironi Kiryat Shmona F.C. players
Maccabi Haifa F.C. players
Beitar Jerusalem F.C. players
Hapoel Ra'anana A.F.C. players
Hapoel Nir Ramat HaSharon F.C. players
Israeli Premier League players
Super League Greece players
Liga Leumit players
Israeli expatriate footballers
Expatriate footballers in Greece
Israeli expatriate sportspeople in Greece
Israeli people of Moroccan-Jewish descent
Footballers from Netanya
Israeli Sephardi Jews
Israeli Mizrahi Jews
Jewish footballers
Association football forwards